The women's 1500 metres race of the 2015–16 ISU Speed Skating World Cup 4, arranged in the Thialf arena in Heerenveen, Netherlands, was held on 13 December 2015.

Heather Richardson-Bergsma of the United States won the race, while compatriot Brittany Bowe came second, and Marrit Leenstra of the Netherlands came third. Natalia Czerwonka of Poland won the Division B race.

Results
The race took place on Sunday, 13 December, with Division B scheduled in the morning session, at 09:45, and Division A scheduled in the afternoon session, at 14:00.

Division A

Division B

References

Women 1500
4